Tettigoniophaga is a genus of tachinid flies in the family Tachinidae.

Species
Tettigoniophaga vanini Guimarães, 1978

Distribution
Brazil.

References

Exoristinae
Diptera of South America
Tachinidae genera
Monotypic Brachycera genera